Eugenia D. Soru (1901–1988) was a Romanian scientist. 

She was a chemist. She was a corresponding member of the Romanian Academy (1955).

References 

1901 births
1988 deaths
20th-century Romanian women
Romanian chemists
Corresponding members of the Romanian Academy
20th-century chemists
Women chemists
Place of birth missing
Place of death missing
Date of birth missing
Date of death missing